Avocado soup is a fruit soup prepared using avocados as a primary ingredient. Ingredients used in its preparation in addition to ripe avocados can include milk, cream, half-and-half or buttermilk, soup stock or broth, water, lime juice, lemon juice, salt and pepper. Additional ingredients used can include onions, shallots, garlic, hot sauce, cilantro, red pepper, cayenne pepper and cumin, and water can be used to thin the soup. It is enjoyed widely in areas of Mexico as a classic dish.

The avocados are typically puréed or mashed, and sliced, diced or cubed avocado can be used as a garnish. Additional garnishes can include sliced lime, sour cream, chives, crab meat, shrimp and salsa fresca. It can be prepared and served as a cold or hot soup.

Avocado soup's color can change as time passes because oxidation causes avocados to brown, but this does not affect the soup's flavor. It can be a relatively easy dish to prepare that does not require a great deal of time.

See also
 Avocado § Culinary uses
 List of avocado dishes
 List of cold soups 
 List of soups

References

Fruit soups
Avocado dishes
Australian soups